Glenn County is a county located in the U.S. state of California. As of the 2020 census, the population was 28,917. The county seat is Willows. It is located in the Sacramento Valley, in the northern part of the California Central Valley. The Grindstone Rancheria, reservation of the Grindstone Indian Rancheria of Wintun-Wailaki Indians, is located in Glenn County.

History

Glenn County split from Colusa County in 1891, from parts of Colusa County.  It was named for Dr. Hugh J. Glenn, who purchased  in the northest end of Rancho Jacinto in 1867. He became the largest wheat farmer in the state during his lifetime and a man of great prominence in political and commercial life in California.

Sheriffs
Peter Herman Clark (1 Mar 1891- 7 Nov 1894)
William H. Sale (7 Nov 1894- 7 Nov 1900)
Jack A. Bailey (7 Nov 1900- 7 Nov 1918)
Newt Collins (7 Nov 1918- 7 Nov 1922)
Roy D. Heard (7 Nov 1922- 7 Nov 1934)
Lawrence Atherton Braden (7 Nov 1934- 7 Nov 1940)
Roy D. Heard (7 Nov 1940- 7 Nov 1946)
Hal Singleton (7 Nov 1946- 27 Dec 1951)- Killed in Car Crash
Ben Karanig (27 Dec 1951- 7 Nov 1980)
Roger Roberts (7 Nov 1980- 7 Nov 1982)
Richard "Rick" Weaver (7 Nov 1982- 7 Nov 1984)
Louis K. Donnelley (7 Nov 1984- 7 Nov 1998)
Robert "Bob" Shadley (7 Nov 1998- 15 Mar 2005) - Resigned
Larry Jones (15 Mar 2005- 7 Nov 2014)
 Richard L. Warren Jr. (7 Nov 2014- )

Geography

Adjacent counties
 Colusa County - south
 Lake County - southwest
 Mendocino County - west
 Tehama County - north
 Butte County - east

National protected areas
 Mendocino National Forest (part)
 Sacramento National Wildlife Refuge (part)
 Sacramento River National Wildlife Refuge (part)

Demographics

2020 census

Note: the US Census treats Hispanic/Latino as an ethnic category. This table excludes Latinos from the racial categories and assigns them to a separate category. Hispanics/Latinos can be of any race.

2011

Places by population, race, and income

2010
The 2010 United States Census reported that Glenn County had a population of 28,122. The racial makeup of Glenn County was 19,990 (71.1%) White, 231 (0.8%) African American, 619 (2.2%) Native American, 722 (2.6%) Asian, 24 (0.1%) Pacific Islander, 5,522 (19.6%) from other races, and 1,014 (3.6%) from two or more races.  Hispanic or Latino of any race were 10,539 persons (37.5%).

2000
As of the census of 2000, there were 26,453 people, 9,172 households, and 6,732 families residing in the county.  The population density was 20 people per square mile (8/km2).  There were 9,982 housing units at an average density of 8 per square mile (3/km2).  The racial makeup of the county was 71.8% White, 0.6% Black or African American, 2.1% Native American, 3.4% Asian, 0.1% Pacific Islander, 18.2% from other races, and 3.9% from two or more races.  29.6% of the population were Hispanic or Latino of any race. 10.8% were of German, 9.4% American, 6.2% English and 5.9% Irish ancestry according to Census 2000. 69.5% spoke English, 27.0% Spanish and 2.1% Hmong as their first language.

There were 9,172 households, out of which 38.1% had children under the age of 18 living with them, 56.7% were married couples living together, 10.9% had a female householder with no husband present, and 26.6% were non-families. 22.0% of all households were made up of individuals, and 10.7% had someone living alone who was 65 years of age or older.  The average household size was 2.84 and the average family size was 3.33.

In the county, the population was spread out, with 30.8% under the age of 18, 8.7% from 18 to 24, 26.8% from 25 to 44, 20.7% from 45 to 64, and 13.0% who were 65 years of age or older.  The median age was 34 years. For every 100 females there were 102.2 males.  For every 100 females age 18 and over, there were 99.5 males.

The median income for a household in the county was $32,107, and the median income for a family was $37,023. Males had a median income of $29,480 versus $21,766 for females. The per capita income for the county was $14,069.  About 12.5% of families and 18.1% of the population were below the poverty line, including 26.3% of those under age 18 and 7.6% of those age 65 or over.

Politics

Voter registration

Cities by population and voter registration

Overview 
Glenn is a strongly Republican county in Presidential and congressional elections. The last Democrat to win a majority in the county was Lyndon Johnson in 1964.

Crime 

The following table includes the number of incidents reported and the rate per 1,000 persons for each type of offense.

Cities by population and crime rates

Transportation

Major highways
 Interstate 5
 State Route 32
 State Route 45
 State Route 162

Public transportation
Glenn Ride runs buses from Willows to Hamilton City, and on into Chico (Butte County). The nearest Amtrak station is in Chico.

Airports
Willows-Glenn County Airport and Haigh Field are both general aviation airports.

Railroads
California Northern Railroad shortline serves Willows.  The main line runs north to Tehama and south to Davis, where the railroad interchanges with the Union Pacific Railroad.  Prior to the line being leased to the California Northern, the route was operated by Southern Pacific and was known as the West Side Line.  The railroad first reached Willows on December 28, 1879, from Davis.  In 1882 the extension from Willows to Tehama was completed.  In 1884 the West Side and Mendocino Railroad constructed a line east from Willows to Fruto.

Communities

Cities
Orland
Willows (county seat)

Census-designated places
Artois
Elk Creek
Hamilton City

Other communities
Butte City
Chrome
Fruto
Meadowood Estates, a former unincorporated community

Population ranking

The population ranking of the following table is based on the 2010 census of Glenn County.

† county seat

See also 
Hiking trails in Glenn County
National Register of Historic Places listings in Glenn County, California
Orland Buttes
Thomas D. Harp, mentions formation of the county

Notes

References

External links

Glenn County Resource Guide

 
California counties
Sacramento Valley
1891 establishments in California
Populated places established in 1891
Majority-minority counties in California